Brambul is an SMB protocol computer worm that decrypts and automatically moves from one computer to its second computer.

It is responsible for the dropping of the Joanap botnet.

History 

Brambul was first discovered in 2009 and has not had a disclosure prior to its notoriety. It was observed by cybersecurity firms and was not extensive subject.

Sony hack (Late 2014) 
Brambul was among the malware to be identified during the Sony Pictures hack.

Investigation (Early 2019)
Brambul as well as Joanap botnet have both been shut down via a court order.

Cycle 
The computer worm has the ability to automatically scan IP addresses and decrypt passwords including, but not limited to the following.

System drive share

Brambul will share information of the system to the cyberattacker. Information shared includes the IP address, hostname and the username and password.

References

External links
HIDDEN COBRA – Joanap Backdoor Trojan and Brambul Server Message Block Worm | CISA

Computer worms
2014 in computing